The Padcal tailings spills of August-September 2012 were a series of mine tailings spills from Tailings Pond 3 of the Philex Mining Corporation's Padcal mine in Benguet Province, Philippines.

The incident began on 1 August 2012 with a massive release on the order of 5 million tonnes or 3 million cubic meters of water and tailings from a breached drainage tunnel (Penstock A) in the pond. The effluent flowed into the Balog River down to Agno River and San Roque Dam. At least four more major discharges were reported: on August 4, 11, and 30, and September 13. The total weight of solids discharged is given by Advocates of Science and Technology for the People, citing a Mines and Geosciences Bureau Report dated Sept. 17, 2012, as 21 million tonnes. The Center for Science in Public Participation gives the volume discharged, for an incident that they date as August 2, but likely refers to the whole August-September series, as 13 million cubic meters. 

The following excerpt from the Advocates of Science and Technology for the People describes the August 1 event:
The first TP3 spill on August 1, 2012 left a huge crater with an estimated radius of 30 kilometers. According to reports, the leakage released around 9.9 million metric tonnes (MMT) of sediments which is equivalent to a volume of 12 operational months. The spill covered 2.5 km long and 15 feet wide of Itogon's Balog River with a thickness of 2-8 feet.
 
The  Environmental  Management  Bureau  (EMB)  of  the  Cordillera  Autonomous  Region  (EMB-CAR) estimated the volume of tailings discharged from August 1-14 at 6 MMT, while the Mines and Geosciences Bureau (MGB) pegged the discharge at 5 MMT. Based on the Summary and Recommendation on Mill Tailings Fee and Liabilities of Philex (MGB Report dated  ept 17, 2012), 
the  total weight of solids discharged is 20,689,179.42 dry MT. (AGHAM and others, 2013, pp 2-3.)

The company tried to plug the initial (August 1) breach with various large objects but was unsuccessful.

The Philippines Department of Environment and Natural Resources issued a statement on 4 August 2012 that it had suspended operation of the mine on August 2, and that the mine operator had stopped the leak.

The effluent smothered marine life in the Balog River, rendering it "practically biologically dead," according to the report by the Advocates of Science and Technology for the People and others. Cobalt, Copper, Zinc, and Arsenic contamination exceeded permitted levels.

Other works
 AGHAM – Advocates of Science and Technology for the People, Center for Environmental Concerns (CEC), and Kalikasan People's Network for the Environment (Kalikasan-PNE). 2013. Environmental Investigation Mission on the Impacts of the Philex Mining Corporation (PMC) Mine Tailings Pond 3 Failure TECHNICAL REPORT   Accessed June 2-18.
 A Schiedel and Alyansa Tigil Mina, 2015. "Philex's Padcal mine, the biggest mining disaster of the Philippines"   Environmental Justice Network. Accessed June 2018.
 Catholic Bishops Conference of the Philippines and others, September 2012. "The Philex Mine Tailings Spill Of 2012: An Independent Fact Finding Mission Report" , Accessed July 2018.
 Center for Science in Public Participation, "Tailings Dam Failures, 1915-2016"   Accessed June 2018.
 Maria Elena Catajan, 2017. 'Mine firm assures integrity of storage facility'   Philippines Sun Star
 Philippines, Department of Environment and Natural resources. 2012. "DENR suspends Philex mining for leak of mine tailings to Balog river"   Accessed June 2012.
 Rappler, 2012. 'Philex confirms 4 mine leaks in Padcal tailings pond in August' September 4. Accessed June 2012.
 Rouchelle R Dingsman, 2012. "Philex spill ‘biggest mining disaster’ in PHL, surpassing Marcopper – DENR"   GMA News, November 12. Accessed June 2018.

Notes

 Tailings dam failures
Copper mines in the Philippines
Benguet
Dam failures in Asia
2012 disasters in the Philippines